Carenum smaragdulum is a species of ground beetle in the subfamily Scaritinae. It was described by Westwood in 1842.

References

smaragdulum
Beetles described in 1842